Mount Imlay  is a national park in New South Wales (Australia), 387 km south of Sydney, named after the Imlay brothers, who were early pioneers to the district. It is accessed from the Princes Highway, south of Eden, New South Wales. The local Aborigines call the mountain "Balawan", and it is very important for their culture and spiritual teachings.

The vegetation is mostly eucalyptus forest. The Imlay Mallee and Imlay Boronia are rare plants growing near the mountain's summit. However, there is a  rainforest remnant surviving in a fire-free gully.  It consists mostly of Black Olive Berry trees. The park contains large populations of wombats and superb lyrebirds.

Geology

Most of Mt Imlay National Park was formed during the Ordovician Period, 500 to 435 million years ago, from sedimentary and metamorphosed rocks of the Mallacoota Beds, part of the Southern Highlands Fold Belt, including greywacke, sandstone and shale. The summit of Mt Imlay and the upper slopes are younger, with Devonian (395 to 345 Million years ago) rocks of the Merimbula Group, lying above the Ordovician sediments. The Merimbula Group includes sandstone, conglomerates, quartzite, siltstone and shale. Quaternary sediments form narrow river flats along the Towamba River on the northern edge of the park.

See also
 Protected areas of New South Wales

Mount Imlay Photos

References

External links 
 Official website

National parks of New South Wales
South Coast (New South Wales)
Protected areas established in 1972
1972 establishments in Australia
Eden, New South Wales